Richard Campion (born 11 March 1941) is an English-born former competition swimmer, who later became a respected Australian swimming administrator.

Swimming career
Campion represented Great Britain in the Olympics and European championships, and England in the Commonwealth Games, in 1958 and 1962. He won a bronze medal in the 880 yards freestyle relay at the 1962 British Empire and Commonwealth Games in Perth, Western Australia. He also won a bronze medal in the 1500-metre freestyle at the 1962 European Aquatics Championships.

He also took part in three freestyle events at the 1960 Summer Olympics; his best Olympic achievement was fourth place in the 4×200-metre relay, setting a new European record.

He won the 1962 ASA National Championship 440 yards freestyle title, the 1961 and 1962 mile titles. and the 220 yards butterfly title in 1957.

Open water
Since 1967 he was promoting open water swimming; around that time he also moved from the United Kingdom to Australia. He took part in several international competitions in 1975 and 1976 and won the 1976 Australian Open Water Swimming Championships. The same year he was elected president of the now-defunct World Professional Marathon Swimming Federation.  Between 1977 and 1979 he was the president of the Australian Marathon Swimming Federation, and a member of the Australian Open Water Swimming Committee from 1988 to 2001.

He wrote the open water swimming handler and trainer's manual, which was adopted by the Australian Swimming Federation and organised the 1999 Pan Pacific Open Water Championships.  Between 1989 and 1998 he was the national open water swimming coach.  He organised the Australian Swimming 16-kilometre Grand Prix Series and the 93-kilometre four-person relay from Malta to Sicily in 1996.

Awards
In 2010 he was inducted to the International Marathon Swimming Hall of Fame as a distinguished Australian swimming administrator.  During that year he was still competing in masters swimming.

See also
 List of Commonwealth Games medallists in swimming (men)

References

1941 births
Living people
European Aquatics Championships medalists in swimming
English male freestyle swimmers
Olympic swimmers of Great Britain
Swimmers at the 1960 Summer Olympics
Commonwealth Games medallists in swimming
Commonwealth Games bronze medallists for England
Swimmers at the 1958 British Empire and Commonwealth Games
Swimmers at the 1962 British Empire and Commonwealth Games
People from Long Melford
Medallists at the 1962 British Empire and Commonwealth Games